Maquoketa can refer to some places in the United States:

The Maquoketa River in Iowa
Maquoketa, Iowa, a city
Maquoketa Township, Jackson County, Iowa
Maquoketa Caves State Park, near Maquoketa, Iowa